Obodoukwu is a suburb town in Ideato North Local Government Area, in Imo State a Southeastern state in Nigeria. It consists of nine villages: Umuagbadagwo, Umunwarahu, Umume, Umumejiaku, Umunkwukwa, Umuoka, Umuezugo/Umuezesheta, Uzubi and Ugbele which consists of kindreds. The marketplace in Obodoukwu is called Eke, which is one of the weekdays in the Igbo calendar. Eke market is the largest market in the town. Obodoukwu is ruled by His Royal highest Eze Dim Agbakwuruigbe. The largest village of the nine villages is Umunwarahu being the capital of the town. The town has famous politicians, musicians, comedians and sculptors.

References

External links
 

Towns in Imo State